The expression "literary Brat Pack" refers to a group of young American authors, including Bret Easton Ellis, Tama Janowitz, Jay McInerney and Jill Eisenstadt, who emerged on the East Coast of the United States in the 1980s.  It is a twist on the same label that had previously been applied to a group of young American actors who frequently appeared together in teen-oriented coming-of-age films earlier that decade.

The earliest published use of this term to refer to writers from that generation was in an article by Bruce Bawer that was entitled "The Literary Brat Pack", that appeared in the Spring 1987 issue of the short-lived West coast magazine Arrival and was included in his 1988 book Diminishing Fictions. Bawer devoted special attention to the writers Meg Wolitzer, David Leavitt, Peter Cameron, Susan Minot, and Elizabeth Tallent, and contrasted the often great critical acclaim they had garnered with their "decidedly modest accomplishments." Shortly thereafter, an article in the New York newspaper Village Voice presented the authors as the new faces of literature. Intended pejoratively, the nickname was illustrated by an image that collaged the authors' faces onto the bodies of infants. Yet their impact on literature and their vast popularity rendered this nickname an affectionate branding of the new wave of young minimalist authors. Each presented a particular challenge to established literary criticism: McInerney's debut novel, Bright Lights, Big City, was told entirely in second-person singular. Janowitz's Slaves of New York explored themes of sexual politics against a backdrop of New York's peculiarities rendered honestly, and Ellis's Less than Zero chronicled a post-adolescent disconnect with society that seemed shocking and pathological.

The works of the Brat Pack authors owed a debt to the minimalist works of Raymond Carver and Ann Beattie, who used clear and sometimes dispassionate ways of rendering modern life that were a clear break from the linguistically heavy and very polite fiction of the previous generation. Unafraid to tackle suburban anxiety and urban angst, the authors broke new ground in subject matter and in style.

In the September/October 2005 issue of Pages magazine, the literary Brat Pack is identified as Bret Easton Ellis, Tama Janowitz, Jay McInerney, and Mark Lindquist. McInerney and Janowitz were based in New York City. Others affiliated with this group include Susan Minot, Donna Tartt, Peter Farrelly and David Leavitt. Lindquist lived in Venice, California, and Ellis moved from Sherman Oaks (in Los Angeles) to Manhattan after the success of Less than Zero.

In an article titled "Where are They Now?", Pages magazine reported that the original four Brat pack authors socialized, but did not have that much in common other than that they were young and well hyped, and that their books were aggressively marketed to a youth audience.

References

External links
 Clean and Sober, A February 1997 Salon magazine article about the brat pack.
 Jay McInerney's official website
 a fan page for the works of Bret Easton Ellis
 Mark Lindquist's official website

Literary circles
20th-century American literature